The Town of Dartmouth was incorporated in 1873. Dartmouth became a City in 1961. It was independently governed by the Dartmouth Town Council until 1996 when it was amalgamated, along with the Towns of Bedford, City of Halifax and Halifax County, into the Halifax Regional Municipality.

Prior to 1931 the mayor was chosen from amongst the elected councillors by a vote of council. The first directly elected mayor was Walter Mosher.

Mayors
 1873–1875 – William S. Symonds
 1875–1877 – George J. Troop
 1877–1880 – William H. Weeks
 1880–1881 – James W. Turner
 1881–1883 – John Y. Payzant
 1883–1885 – John F. Stairs
 1885–1886 – John C.P. Frazee
 1886–1887 – Byron A. Weston
 1888–1889 – James Simmonds
 1889–1891 – Frederick Scarfe
 1892–1893 – John C. Oland
 1894–1896 – William H. Sterns
 1897–1901 – A. C. Johnson
 1902–1905 – Frederick Scarfe
 1906–1907 – E.F. Williams
 1908–1912 – Thomas Notting
 1913–1918 – E.F. Williams
 1919–1920 – H.O. Simpson
 1921–1922 – I.W. Vidito
 1922–1924 – Walter Mosher
 1925–1927 – Charles A. McLean
 1928–1933 – Walter Mosher
 1934–1935 – Walter A. Topple
 1936–1937 – Walter Mosher
 1938–1947 – L.J. Isnor
 1948–1949 – A. C. Pettipas
 1950–1955 – C.H. Morris
 1956–1963 – I.W. Akerly
 1964–1967 – Joseph Zatzman
 1968–1972 – Roland J. Thornhill
 1973–1975 – Eileen Stubbs
 1976–1985 – Daniel Brownlow
 1985–1992 – John Savage
 1992–1996 – Gloria McCluskey

Dartmouth
Government in Halifax, Nova Scotia